Sessame is a comune (municipality) in the Province of Asti in the Italian region Piedmont, located about  southeast of Turin and about  southeast of Asti. 

Sessame borders the following municipalities: Bistagno, Cassinasco, Monastero Bormida, Ponti, and Rocchetta Palafea.

References

External links
 Official website

Cities and towns in Piedmont